Calosoma roeschkei is a species of ground beetle in the family Carabidae. It is found in Africa.

References

Calosoma
Beetles described in 1927